Non-Aristotelian drama, or the 'epic form' of the drama, is a kind of play whose dramaturgical structure departs from the features of classical tragedy in favour of the features of the epic, as defined in each case by the ancient Greek philosopher Aristotle in his Poetics (c.335 BCE)

The German modernist theatre practitioner Bertolt Brecht coined the term 'non-Aristotelian drama' to describe the dramaturgical dimensions of his own work, beginning in 1930 with a series of notes and essays entitled "On a non-aristotelian drama". In them, he identifies his musical The Threepenny Opera (1928) as an example of "epic form". "[B]y Aristotle's definition," Brecht writes, "the difference between the dramatic and epic forms was attributed to their different methods of construction." Method of construction here refers to the relation the play establishes between its parts and its whole:

Brecht also defines the contrast between the traditional, Aristotelian 'dramatic' and his own 'epic' as corresponding to idealist and materialist philosophical positions:

It is this materialist perspective on the world, and specifically on the human being, that renders the epic form particularly appropriate and useful to the dramatist, Brecht argues. Contemporary science (the term includes what English calls "human sciences"; especially, for Brecht, historical materialism) reveals that the human being is determined by and determining of its circumstances ("social" and "physical"). The epic form enables the drama to stage humanity in a way that incorporates this scientific understanding; the dramatist becomes able to show the human (the level of interpersonal relationships) in interaction with the larger forces and dynamics at work in society (the supra-personal, historical scale):

Epic Theatre also rejects the principle of natura non facit saltus (nature does not make jumps) which is a methodological assumption of Swedish naturalist Carl Linnæus used in his categorization of plants and animals.

See also
 Allan Kaprow
 Avant-garde
 Dick Higgins
 Elizabeth LeCompte
 Experimental theatre
 The Flea Theater
 Fluxus
 Happenings
 Intermedia
 Marina Abramović
 Ontological-Hysteric Theater
 Performance art
 Performing Garage
 Richard Foreman
 Richard Schechner
 "Speculations: An Essay on the Theater"
 The Wooster Group

Notes

Works cited

 Brecht, Bertolt. 1964. Brecht on Theatre: The Development of an Aesthetic. Ed. and trans. John Willett. British edition. London: Methuen. . USA edition. New York: Hill and Wang. .
 Brecht, Bertolt. 1965. The Messingkauf Dialogues. Trans. John Willett. Bertolt Brecht: Plays, Poetry, Prose Ser. London: Methuen, 1985. .
 Szondi, Peter. 1965. Theory of the Modern Drama. Ed. and trans. Michael Hays. Theory and History of Literature Ser. 29. Minneapolis: University of Minnesota Press, 1987. .
 Willett, John. 1964. Editorial notes. In Brecht on Theatre: The Development of an Aesthetic by Bertolt Brecht. British edition. London: Methuen. . USA edition. New York: Hill and Wang. .
 Williams, Raymond. 1993. Drama from Ibsen to Brecht. London: Hogarth. . pp. 277–290.

Bertolt Brecht theories and techniques
Modernist theatre